Frank Clarke is the name of:

Politicians
 Frank Gay Clarke (1850–1901), U.S. Representative from New Hampshire
 Frank Clarke (Australian politician) (1879–1955)
 Frank Clarke (British politician) (1886–1938), MP for Dartford

Sportspeople
 Frank Clarke (American football) (1934–2018)
 Frank Clarke (footballer) (1942–2022), English football player
 Frank Clarke (triathlete), Canadian triathlete in 1992 ITU Triathlon World Championships
 Frank Clarke (cricketer) (born 1936), Welsh former cricketer

Others
 Frank Wigglesworth Clarke (1847–1931), American chemist and mineralologist
 Frank Clarke (pilot) (1898–1948), Hollywood stunt pilot
 Frank Clarke (editor) (1915–2002), British film editor
 Frank Edward Clarke (1849–1899), New Zealand ichthyologist and artist
 Frank Clarke (judge) (born 1951), Irish former Supreme Court judge
 Frank L. Clarke (born 1933), Australian business economist

See also
 Frank Clark (disambiguation)
 Francis Clarke (disambiguation)